Natsu is a Shiba Inu dog owned by French video artist Squeezie. In 2022, he is followed on Instagram by 763,000 followers.

Biography 
In September 2017, Squeezie went to Japan to adopt a canine companion: a Shiba. He brings Natsu back to France a few months after meeting him in Japan because of adaptation problems.

See also 

 Squeezie
 Shiba (dog)

References

External links 

 

Individual dogs
Dogs in France
Animals on the Internet